Iridomyrmex xanthocoxa is a species of ant in the genus Iridomyrmex. Described in 2011, the ant is mainly confined to the Pilbara region of Western Australia.

Etymology
Its name deprives from the Greek language, and translate as: ‘xanthos’—‘ yellow’ plus ‘coxa’, which references the colour appearance on the species.

References

Iridomyrmex
Hymenoptera of Australia
Insects described in 2011